The 1969 All-Ireland Senior Camogie Championship was the high point of the 1969 season in Camogie. The championship was won by Wexford who defeated Antrim by a two-point margin in the final.

The championship
After decades of dominance by Dublin, the camogie championship had been thrown open by events of the previous 18 months. Five counties Wexford, Antrim, Kilkenny, Cork and Dublin were serious contenders for the 1969 title with Tipperary and Galway not far behind. Cork lost to Tipperary in the Munster semi-final and then Tipp beat limerick in the Munster final.

A player from each side was sent off for the first time in an inter-county match in 1969, Mary Graham (Tipperary) and Josie Kehoe (Wexford) were sent off by referee Nancy Murray for rough play in the All Ireland semi-final. Margaret O’Leary struck a late free to the Tipperary net to give Wexford a 4–4 to 3–3 victory. Galway trailed Antrim by seven points at the break in the second semi-final at Glenariffe, then came back with a storming finish only to fail by a single point to catch Antrim.

Final
It took a great goal by Cathy Power, 90 seconds from time, to save the day for Wexford in the All-Ireland final against Antrim at Croke Park on 21 September. The lead changed hands twice in the closing minutes as Antrim made a remarkable comeback and they were within touching distance of snatching an unexpected victory. The political situation in Northern Ireland had prevented Antrim from preparing for the final as they would have liked.  Agnes Hourigan wrote in the Irish Press:  Wexford are still All-Ireland camogie champions, but only, one might say, by a single puck of the ball, for it took a great goal 90 seconds from time by corner forward Catherine Power to save the day and the title for the Leinster girls after an unfancied Antrim had seemed certain to snatch unexpected victory from an amazing second half rally. The high excitement of the closing stages, the lead changed hands twice in the last couple of minutes, coupled with some magnificent camogie all through rp0ivded wonderful entertainment for the fair-sized crowd. If Antrim failed to climax their great comeback with what would have been a remarkable victory, they certainly proved that they are still ads good as the best, and they have in Mairead McAtamney one of the greatest players of all time.

Final stages

 
MATCH RULES
50 minutes
Replay if scores level
Maximum of 3 substitutions

See also
 All-Ireland Senior Hurling Championship
 Wikipedia List of Camogie players
 National Camogie League
 Camogie All Stars Awards
 Ashbourne Cup

References

External links
 Camogie Association
 Historical reports of All Ireland finals
 All-Ireland Senior Camogie Championship: Roll of Honour
 Camogie on facebook
 Camogie on GAA Oral History Project

All-Ireland Senior Camogie Championship
1969
All-Ireland Senior Camogie Championship